, also known as KFB, is a Japanese broadcast network affiliated with the ANN. Their headquarters are located in Kōriyama City, Fukushima Prefecture.

History

Pre-launch 
Prior to its launch, there were already 2 stations set up in the prefecture: Fukushima TV (affiliated to Fuji TV, TV Asahi, and TBS) and Fukushima Central TV (affiliated to Nippon TV). In June 1980, the Ministry of Posts (now known as the Ministry of Internal Affairs and Communications) opened applications for Fukushima's third private broadcaster, attracting 112 companies.After talks between the four main commercial broadcasters in Japan and Radio Fukushima in December 1980, it was agreed that the affiliate for the new broadcaster would be from TV Asahi.

Both TV Asahi and TBS, which were interested in applying for a broadcast license, hoped to use "Fukushima Broadcasting" as a tentative name for the new regional broadcaster. Later, TV Asahi made plans to either use "Fukushima Asahi Broadcasting" or "Fukushima Asahi Television" as its names, but neither name was approved by the Ministry of Posts.On December 19 of the same year, the new broadcaster obtained a license under the name Fukushima Broadcasting.

Fukushima Broadcasting chose Koriyama City as the location of its headquarters as Koriyama is the largest economic city in the prefecture. On February 4, 1981, the broadcaster was founded.

Launching and further developments 
After its headquarters completed on August 10, 1981, pilot broadcasts began on September 15 of the same year. At 6:20am on October 1, 1981, Fukushima Broadcasting started its broadcasting operations.The broadcaster also entered into event sponsorships such as Fukushima Summer Festival and NASA Space Science Expo.In addition, the broadcaster also held cultural activities such as the performing of the Vienna Boys' Choir in the prefecture.

When TV-U Fukushima started broadcasting in 1983, Fukushima already had 4 commercial broadcasters in the prefecture.In 1985, a broadcasting union was established.KFB first used the Electronic news-gathering system in 1989In order to update the main control room equipment, KFB began to renovate the headquarters in 1997. This series of works was completed in April 1998. On September 6, 1998, a mechanical failure occurred at the Fukushima Broadcasting Aizuwakamatsu broadcasting station, causing about 87,500 households in the Aizu area to be unable to watch the Fukushima Broadcasting program for 8.5 hours.

Stations

Analog 
Fukushima(Main Station) JOJI-TV 35ch
Aizuwakamatsu 41ch
Iwaki 36ch
Tomioka 40ch
Haramachi 48ch
Shirakawa 46ch
Takine 61ch
Mizuishi 60ch
Hanawa 42ch
Bandai-Atami 21ch
Fukushima-Shinobu 47ch
Tsuchiyu 53ch
Nihonmatsu 57ch
Watari 62ch
Naganuma 54ch
Yanaizu-Mishima 58ch
Futaba-Kawauchi 56ch
Ishikawa 43ch
Tajima 35ch
Iidate 48ch
Iwaki-Tono 52ch
Aizu-Higashiyama 59ch
Iidate-Mukōshi 54ch
Iidate-Sekizawa 53ch
Iwaki-Yotsunami 39ch
Ten'ei 59ch
Kōriyama-Kawachi 54ch
Bandai-Takatama 50ch
Warabidaira 39ch
Kawamata 43ch
Iwaki-Yumoto 50ch
Nishiaizu 59ch
Nishiaizu-Okugawa 52ch
Higashi-Kaneyama 52ch
Tsukidate 57ch
Yamatsuri 57ch
Funehiki 43ch
Ōsato 41ch
Kaneyama 59ch
Nishi-Kaneyama 59ch
Arami 60ch
Kōriyama-Tamura 41ch
Miharu 50ch
Shōwa 38ch
Higashi-Tadami 61ch
Higashi-Shōwa 58ch
Tadami 42ch
Nangō 38ch
Kita-Kawamata 40ch
Nishi-Furudono 57ch
Furudono 25ch
Higashi-Urabandai 60ch
Urabandai 48ch
Nishigō-Yachinaka 53ch
Izumizaki-Ōtagawa 48ch
Furudono-Matsukawa 60ch
Ina 58ch
Tanagura-Tomioka 41ch
Inugami 39ch
Minami-Kawamata 52ch
Nishigō-Nagasaka 38ch
Tōwa-Harimichi 42ch
Nishigō-Mushikasa 39ch
Hobara-Tomizawa 52ch
Fukushima-Ōnami 54ch
Yomogita 26ch

Digital(ID:5)
Fukushima(Main Station) JOJI-DTV 29ch

Programs

Rival Stations

References

External links
 Fukushima Broadcasting

All-Nippon News Network
Asahi Shimbun Company
Companies based in Fukushima Prefecture
Television stations in Japan
Mass media in Kōriyama
Television networks in Japan
Television channels and stations established in 1981
1981 establishments in Japan